HMS Orpheus was an  of the Royal Navy.

Design and construction

The Oberon class was a direct follow on of the Porpoise-class, with the same dimensions and external design, but updates to equipment and internal fittings, and a higher grade of steel used for fabrication of the pressure hull.

Displacement was 1,610 tons standard, 2,030 tons full load when surfaced, and 2,410 tons full load when submerged. Propulsion machinery consisted of 2 Admiralty Standard Range 16 VMS diesel generators, and two  electric motors, each driving a  3-bladed propeller at up to 400 rpm. Eight  diameter torpedo tubes were fitted (six facing forward, two aft), with a total payload of 24 torpedoes. The boats were fitted with Type 186 and Type 187 sonars, and an I-band surface search radar. The standard complement was 68: 6 officers, 62 sailors. Unlike other members of the class, which had a fin made from glass fibre-reinforced plastic, the fin of Orpheus was made of aluminium alloy.

Orpheus was laid down by Vickers-Armstrongs on 16 April 1959, and launched on 17 November 1959. The boat was commissioned into the Royal Navy on 25 November 1960.

Operational history

In mid-1964, Orpheus joined the 3rd Submarine Flotilla based at Faslane. In Juny 1965 she carried out submarine escape trials off Malta, with a record  free ascent made. Other duties including training Canadian and Australian crews for Oberon-class submarines that were being built for those countries. On 15 February 1967 Orpheus collided with sister-ship  in poor weather and darkness off Portsmouth Harbour. Orpheuss commanding officer was reprimanded at the resultant court martial.

Orpheus attended the 1977 Silver Jubilee Fleet Review off Spithead when she was part of the Submarine Flotilla.

Decommissioning and fate
She was in harbour service in 1987 and was broken up in 1994.

References

Publications

 

Oberon-class submarines of the Royal Navy
Ships built in Barrow-in-Furness
1959 ships
Cold War submarines of the United Kingdom